Nobutaka (written: 信孝, 信教, 信隆, 延孝 or 伸貴) is a masculine Japanese given name. Notable people with the name include:

, Japanese volleyball player
, Japanese neuroscientist and cell biologist
, Japanese politician
, Japanese samurai
, Japanese general
, Japanese footballer
, Japanese swimmer
, Japanese footballer
, Japanese politician

Japanese masculine given names